Steve Oliver (born January 11, 1962) is an American musician, guitarist, vocalist, songwriter, and producer.  Although best known for his work in the field of contemporary or “smooth” jazz, he performs in a wide variety of styles including pop, rock, Latin, electronic, and world music.  A prolific performer, Oliver tours regularly and has scored multiple hit singles on the Billboard contemporary jazz chart.

Accolades and accomplishments 
 3 number 1 singles on Billboard contemporary jazz chart.
 13 Top 20 singles on Billboard contemporary jazz chart.
 Two time Canadian Smooth Jazz Awards nominee for best international artist.
 “Fun in the Sun” from the album “Global Kiss” was number 1 on the Billboard contemporary jazz chart for 8 weeks.

Discography

Studio albums 
 First View (1999)
 Positive Energy (2002)
 3D (2004)
 Radiant (2006)
 Snowfall (2006)
 Global Kiss (2010)
 World Citizen (2012)
 Pictures & Frames (2016)
 Illuminate (2018)
 Unified (2020) with Brian Simpson
 Sojourn (2022)

Live albums 
 One Night Live (2008) with DVD

Compilation albums 
 Best of so Far (2014)

References

External links 
 Official Website

1962 births
Living people
American male guitarists
American male songwriters
American record producers
20th-century American guitarists
20th-century American male musicians
Smooth jazz guitarists
Native Language Music artists
Shanachie Records artists